Giovanni Cavalcanti (born 17 November 1943) is an Italian former racing cyclist. He rode in the 1975 Tour de France, where he notably finished second on stage 12.

Major results
1967
 1st Stage 9 Tour de l'Avenir
1969
 3rd GP Forli
1971
 6th Coppa Placci
 8th Coppa Bernocchi
 10th Overall Giro d'Italia
 10th Overall Tour de Suisse
1973
 10th Overall Tour de Romandie
1974
 7th GP Cemab
 8th Giro di Romagna
1975
 4th Giro del Veneto

Grand Tour general classification results timeline

References

External links
 

1943 births
Living people
Italian male cyclists
Sportspeople from the Province of Ravenna
Cyclists from Emilia-Romagna